Policy, Politics, & Nursing Practice is a quarterly peer-reviewed nursing journal that covers the field of nursing and health policy. The editor-in-chief is Sally S. Cohen (New York University College of Nursing). It was established in 2000 and is currently published by SAGE Publications.

Abstracting and indexing 
Policy, Politics, & Nursing Practice is abstracted and indexed in:
 Academic Search
 CINAHL
 EmCare
 MEDLINE
 NISC
 Scopus

External links 
 

SAGE Publishing academic journals
English-language journals
General nursing journals
Publications established in 2000
Quarterly journals